Jeffrey Leiper (born 1970) is the current Ottawa city councillor for Kitchissippi Ward. He was first elected in the 2014 Ottawa municipal election, defeating the incumbent Katherine Hobbs.

Leiper was born and raised in Ottawa. He studied History and English at the University of Ottawa, and Print Journalism at Algonquin College. As a youth, Leiper was a member of the youth wing of the Progressive Conservative Party of Canada, though he is now a committed progressive. Leiper first ran for office as a 24 year old in the 1994 municipal elections for a seat on Cumberland Township Council. At the time he was still attending the University of Ottawa. He ran on a platform of higher density developments, the completion of a north-south link between then Highway 17 (now Highway 174) and Highway 417 (which was never built), more parks and the completion of a library. Running in Ward 2, covering the southern section of Orleans, he won just 3% of the vote.

He has lived in Kitchissippi Ward since 1995 when he and his spouse Natalie moved into the Julian Apartments in the Wellington West area. Today, he lives in Hintonburg with Natalie and their son.

Leiper has a long background working with the Hintonburg Community Association, where he served as its president. He has also worked with the volunteer-run community newspaper Newswest in the ward. For many years, he created and organized events such as the Cyclelogik Hintonburg 5k Run/Walk and Newswest Kids 1K, Dog Movie Night and the annual Hintonburg Street Hockey Tournament. His community work includes a significant background in planning, traffic, economic development, and other neighbourhood and citywide issues.

Professionally, Leiper began his career in the Information and Communications Technology sector as a journalist. He subsequently worked as an industry analyst for an international consulting firm, then as an executive in a federal regulatory agency. Prior to his election, he worked as an executive at an NGO with a mandate to promote the full participation by all Canadians including women, youth, and internationally educated professionals in the technology workforce.

Electoral record

References

External links
Ward Website
Official City of Ottawa Biography
Personal site
Twitter account

Living people
Ottawa city councillors
1970 births
University of Ottawa alumni